The Fall may refer to:

 The fall of man in Abrahamic religions
 Autumn, the season of falling leaves

Comics and games 
 Assassin's Creed: The Fall (2010–11) a comic tie-in to the game series
 Deus Ex: The Fall (2013), an iOS game set in the Deus Ex series
 The Fall (video game) (2014), an adventure, puzzle solving, and side-scroller action game
 The Fall: Last Days of Gaia (2004), a post-apocalyptic role-playing game for Microsoft Windows

Film and television 
 The Fall (1969 film), a documentary film about the Vietnam War by Peter Whitehead
 The Fall (1999 film), a thriller directed by Andrew Piddington
 The Fall (2006 film), a fantasy film by Tarsem Singh, starring Lee Pace
 The Fall (2008 film), an independent crime film
 The Fall (TV series), a British-Irish TV series first broadcast in 2013, starring Gillian Anderson
 Fall (2022 film), a thriller directed by Scott Mann

Literature 
 The Fall (Camus novel), a 1956 novel by Albert Camus
 The Fall (del Toro and Hogan novel), the 2011 second novel in The Strain trilogy by Guillermo Del Toro and Chuck Hogan
 The Fall (Muchamore novel), the 2007 seventh book in the CHERUB series by Robert Muchamore
 The Fall (Nix novel), the 2000 first book in The Seventh Tower series by Garth Nix
 The Fall (Star Trek novels), a 2013 Star Trek tie-in miniseries by various authors

Music 
 The Fall (band), an English post-punk group

Albums 
 The Fall, a 1997 album by King James
 The Fall, a 2001 album by Cesium 137
 The Fall (Norah Jones album), 2009
 The Fall (Gorillaz album), 2010
 The Fall, a 2014 mixtape by XXXTentacion
 The Fall, a 2014 extended play by Ritual
 The Fall, a 2019 extended play by Sarah Kinsley
 The Fall (EP), a 2019 extended play by Dallas Smith

Songs 
 "The Fall", by Electric Light Orchestra, from the 1980 film Xanadu
 "The Fall", by A Flock of Seagulls, from the 1983 album Listen
 "The Fall", by Beat Happening, from the 1985 album Beat Happening
 "The Fall", by Nomeansno, from the 1991 album 0 + 2 = 1
 "The Fall" (Ministry song), 1996
 "The Fall", by Bright from the 2000 album Full Negative (or) Breaks
 "The Fall", by Way Out West, from the 2001 album Intensify
 "The Fall" (Brendan James song), 2010
 "The Fall", by Gary Numan, from the 2011 album Dead Son Rising
 "The Fall", by The Weeknd, from the 2011 mixtape Echoes of Silence
 "The Fall", by Rhye, from the 2013 album Woman
"The Fall", by Imagine Dragons from the 2015 album Smoke + Mirrors
 "The Fall", by Markus Feehily from the 2015 album Fire
 "The Fall", by Dallas Smith from the 2020 album Timeless
 "The Fall", by Lovejoy from the 2021 EP Pebble Brain

See also 
  Fall (disambiguation)
 Fallen (disambiguation)
 Falling (disambiguation)
 Fallout (disambiguation)
 Falls (disambiguation)
 Fell (disambiguation)
 The Falls (disambiguation)